Andrew Holt (May 20, 1855 – February 11, 1948) was an American jurist.

Born in East Union, Minnesota, Holt went to Gustavus Adolphus College and then graduated from University of Minnesota in 1880. Holt was admitted to the Minnesota bar in 1881 and then practiced law in Minneapolis, Minnesota. He served as municipal judge and then as district court judge in 1904. Holt served on the Minnesota Supreme Court from 1912 to 1942. He was the first supreme court justice born in Minnesota. Holt died at his home in Minneapolis, Minnesota.

Notes

1855 births
1948 deaths
People from Carver County, Minnesota
Politicians from Minneapolis
Gustavus Adolphus College alumni
University of Minnesota alumni
Minnesota state court judges
Justices of the Minnesota Supreme Court
Lawyers from Minneapolis